Diamond Trust Bank Uganda Limited (DTBUL), is a commercial bank headquartered in Uganda. It is licensed and supervised by the Bank of Uganda, the central bank and national banking regulator.

Overview
As at December 2018, the bank's total assets were valued at about UGX:1.606 trillion (approximately US$438.574 million), with UGX:222.5 billion (approximately US$60.8 million) in shareholders' equity. As of 31 December 2015, DTBUL was the seventh largest commercial bank in Uganda by assets, controlling about 4 percent of the assets in the banking industry.

History
The bank dates to 1945, when it was operating as the Diamond Jubilee Investment Trust (DJIT), with its head office in Dar es Salaam, Tanzania, and branches in Mombasa, Kenya and Kampala, Uganda. Branches were later opened at Nairobi and Kisumu in Kenya. The company was initially established as a community-based finance house, dedicated towards the extension of credit to the East African Ismaili Community and the mobilization of their savings. In 1965, DJIT was split into three entities, one each in Kenya, Tanzania, and Uganda.

In 1968, the rapid economic development of post-independence Uganda saw the founding of Diamond Trust Properties Uganda Limited. In 1972, Diamond Trust (Uganda) Limited (DTU) commenced operations as a non-bank financial institution. Between 1972 and the early 1990s, DTU was largely moribund because of political instability.

In 1995, the institution was recapitalized with the participation of the Aga Khan Fund for Economic Development and Diamond Trust Bank (Kenya) Limited. In 1997, the bank became a full-service commercial bank and was renamed Diamond Trust Bank (Uganda) Limited.

Diamond Trust Bank Group

DTBU is a member of the Diamond Trust Bank Group, a large financial services provider with operations in Burundi, Kenya, Rwanda, Tanzania, and Uganda.

Ownership
Diamond Trust Bank (Kenya) Limited owns at least 56.97 percent of the shares in Diamond Trust Bank (Uganda) Limited.

See also
 Banking in Uganda
 List of banks in Uganda
 List of tallest buildings in Kampala

References

External links

Aga Khan Development Network
Banks of Uganda
Banks established in 1945
1945 establishments in Uganda
Companies based in Kampala